EVSC may refer to:

Eurovision Song Contest, an annual European television competition
Evansville Vanderburgh School Corporation, a school district in southern Indiana